The Maine is an American rock band, formed in Tempe, Arizona in 2007. The band has released six studio albums, eight extended plays, seven singles and eighteen music videos. Their debut album, Can't Stop Won't Stop was released on July 8, 2008, peaking at No. 40 on the Billboard 200. Their second album, Black & White was released on July 13, 2010, peaking No.19 on the Billboard 200. Their third album, Pioneer was released on December 6, 2011, and peaked at No. 90 on the Billboard 200. Forever Halloween, their fourth album, was released on June 4, 2013, and peaked at No. 39 on Billboard 200. Their fifth album American Candy was released on March 31, 2015, and peaked at No. 37 on the Billboard 200.

As of December 2010, the band has sold 156,000 albums and 768,000 digital singles.

Albums

Studio albums

Compilation albums

Live albums

Extended plays

Singles

Lead singles

Promotional singles

Music videos

Notes

References

Discographies of American artists